Challwayuq (Quechua challwa fish, -yuq, "the one with fish", also spelled Chalhuayoc) is a mountain in the Cordillera Central in the Andes of Peru which reaches a height of approximately . It is located in the Junín Region, Concepción Province, Quero District, southwest of San José de Quero.

References 

Mountains of Peru
Mountains of Junín Region